This is a list of American Samoa locations by per capita income. In 2010 American Samoa had a per capita income of $6,311 — the lowest of any state or territory in the United States. In 2010 the median household income of American Samoa was $23,892, one of the lowest in the United States. In 2017, American Samoa had a poverty rate of 65% — the highest poverty rate of any state or territory in the United States.

American Samoa counties ranked by per capita income

Note: American Samoa is divided into 14 “counties”, but these “counties” are not counted by the U.S. Census Bureau — instead, the U.S. Census Bureau counts American Samoa's 3 districts and 2 atolls as county-equivalents. See Administrative divisions of American Samoa for more information.

Data for this table is from American FactFinder (2010 U.S. Census).

American Samoa villages ranked by per capita income

This is a list of American Samoa villages ranked by per capita income:

References

United States locations by per capita income
Economy of American Samoa